Elliot Engel is an American author, writer, scholar, and lecturer.

Biography 
Originally from Indianapolis, Indiana, Dr. Engel now lives in Raleigh, North Carolina. He has served as a professor and lecturer at UCLA (where he was awarded the University's Outstanding Teacher Award and where he earned his M.A. and Ph.D. as a Woodrow Wilson Fellow), at North Carolina State University, the University of North Carolina at Chapel Hill, and Duke University.

Engel has authored several books that have been published in England, Japan, Turkey, and the United States.   Among the books are A Dab of Dickens & A Touch of Twain (Simon & Schuster) - an edited collection of several of his well-known lectures,  and Pickwick Papers: An Annotated Bibliography.
Engel's mini-lecture series on Charles Dickens ran on PBS television stations around the country.

Four plays which Engel has written have been produced during the last ten years.  Engel's play, The Night Before Christmas Carol, has enjoyed success as an annual national public television broadcast in both the United States and Canada, an EbzB Productions' performance with actor David zum Brunnen, as well as having enjoyed multi-year touring success nationally with the same actor. The premiere collaboration of The Night Before Christmas Carol featured actor Jeffrey West, who originated the role on stages in North Carolina.

Engel's articles have appeared in numerous newspapers and national magazines including Newsweek. He has lectured throughout the United States and on all seven continents (although his Antarctica lecture was delivered on a cruise ship).  He continues his teaching and lectures at present.

Widely recognized for his concentration in Dickensian Scholarship, Engel received North Carolina’s Adult Education Award, North Carolina State’s Alumni Professorship, and the Victorian Society’s Award of Merit. In 2009, he was inducted into the Royal Society of Arts in England for his academic work and service in promoting Charles Dickens.

Most recently in 2014, Engel was named Tar Heel of the Week by the Raleigh News and Observer for his thirty years of delivering public programs in the humanities and sponsoring state and national literary contests for high school students.  Since 1980, Dr. Engel has been President of the Dickens Fellowship of North Carolina, the largest branch of this worldwide network of clubs. The sales of Dr. Engel’s books, CDs, and DVDs have raised funds for Great Ormond Street Hospital, formerly the Hospital for Sick Children, which Dickens helped found in London in 1852.

References

University of California, Los Angeles faculty
Living people
Year of birth missing (living people)